Gola is a language of Liberia and Sierra Leone. It was traditionally classified as an Atlantic language, but this is no longer accepted in more recent studies.

Classification
Gola is not closely related to other languages and appears to form its own branch of the Niger–Congo language family. However, Ethnologue lists Gola as a Mel language. Fields (2004) classifies Gola as a Mel language most closely related to Bullom and Kisi.

Distribution
According to Ethnologue, Gola is spoken in widespread regions across Liberia. It is spoken in Gbarpolu County, Grand Cape Mount County, and Lofa County (between the Mano River and Saint Paul River), as well as in inland areas of Bomi County and Montserrado County.

Dialects are Deng (Todii), Kongba, and Senje.

References

Atlantic languages
Gola people
Languages of Liberia
Languages of Sierra Leone